Lycaena clarki, the eastern sorrel copper, is a butterfly of the family Lycaenidae. It is found only in South Africa.

The wingspan is 21–27 mm in males and 22–30 mm in females. The butterfly flies year-round, peaking in summer.

Larval food is Rumex lanceolatus. The larvae vary considerably in colour, ranging from plain green to pinkish red. However, there is always a white subspiracular stripe and a dorsal line of a darker colour. Both eggs and pupa may hibernate.

References

Lycaena
Butterflies described in 1971
Butterflies of Africa